Sire is an archaic respectful form of address to reigning kings in Europe. In French and other languages it is less archaic and relatively more current. In Belgium, the king is addressed as "Sire..." in both Dutch and French.

The words "sire" and "sir", as well as the French "(mon)sieur" and the Spanish "señor", share a common etymological origin, all ultimately being related to the Latin senior.  The female equivalent form of address is dame or dam.

See also 

 Forms of address in the United Kingdom
 King
 Nobility

References 

Men's social titles
Nobility
Royal styles